The United Kingdom–Japan Comprehensive Economic Partnership Agreement (CEPA) (Japanese: 日英包括的経済連携協定) is a free trade agreement between the United Kingdom and Japan. The agreement was agreed in principle by both parties in September 2020 and signed in Tokyo in October 2020, following the United Kingdom's withdrawal from the European Union in January 2020. It entered into force at the end of the transition period on 31 December 2020.

History 
On June 9, 2020 Toshimitsu Motegi, Japan's Minister for Foreign Affairs, and Liz Truss, the UK's Secretary of State for International Trade, agreed to launch negotiations and to establish the future economic partnership between Japan and the United Kingdom. On June 10 2020, the first meeting of chief negotiators was held after the launch of negotiations on the future economic partnership between Japan and the UK. This was followed by video conference rounds on June 24, July 8, 15, 22 and 29. The seventh, and final, round was held on August 3.

The agreement is essentially the same as the European Union–Japan Economic Partnership Agreement concluded in February 2019. 

The UK–Japan Comprehensive Economic Partnership Agreement was agreed in principle by Truss and Motegi on a video call on 11 September 2020.

The UK–Japan Comprehensive Economic Partnership Agreement was signed by International Trade Secretary Liz Truss and Japan's Foreign Minister Motegi Toshimitsu in Tokyo 23 October 2020.

Legal & treaty text 

On 23 October 2020, the UK Government published the text of the Agreement.

Areas Covered in the FTA
 Agriculture, food and drink
 Manufacturing
 Digital and data
 Financial services
 Creative industry
 Fashion
 Small and medium enterprises (SMEs)
 Services
 Investment
 Goods

"The quota available to Japanese importers for British products will be the entirety of any unutilised EU quota in that year."

See also 
 List of Bilateral Agreements
 Economic Partnership Agreement (Japan-EU)
 List of Multilateral Agreements
 Trade agreements of the United Kingdom

References

2020 treaties
Treaties concluded in 2020
Treaties entered into force in 2020
Free trade agreements of the United Kingdom
Free trade agreements of Japan
Treaties of Japan
Treaties of the United Kingdom
Japan–United Kingdom relations
Liz Truss